Greene County is a county in the U.S. state of Indiana. As of 2010, the population was 33,165. The county seat is Bloomfield. The county was determined by the US Census Bureau to include the mean center of U.S. population in 1930.

History
Greene County was formed in 1821, from unincorporated territory and from a portion of the previous Sullivan County. It was named for General Nathanael Greene, who commanded the southern theater in the American Revolutionary War, which eventually forced the British army under Charles Cornwallis to retreat to Yorktown. There it was forced to surrender, ensuring American independence.

Climate and weather

Government

The county government is a constitutional body, and is granted specific powers by the Constitution of Indiana, and by the Indiana Code.

County Council: The county council is the legislative branch of the county government and controls all the spending and revenue collection in the county. Representatives are elected from county districts. The council members serve four-year terms. They are responsible for setting salaries, the annual budget, and special spending. The council also has limited authority to impose local taxes, in the form of an income and property tax that is subject to state level approval, excise taxes, and service taxes.

Board of Commissioners: The executive body of the county is made of a board of commissioners. The commissioners are elected county-wide, in four-year staggered terms. This board is charged with executing the acts legislated by the council, collecting revenue, and managing the day-to-day functions of the county government.

Court: The county maintains a small claims court that can handle some civil cases. The judge on the court is elected to a term of four years and must be a member of the Indiana Bar Association. The judge is assisted by a constable who is also elected to a four-year term. In some cases, court decisions can be appealed to the state level circuit court.

County Officials: The county has several other elected offices, including sheriff, coroner, auditor, treasurer, recorder, surveyor and circuit court clerk. Each serves a term of four years and oversees a different part of county government. Members elected to county government positions are required to declare party affiliations and to be residents of the county.

Greene County is part of Indiana's 8th congressional district; Indiana Senate districts 39 and 48; and Indiana House of Representatives districts 45, 60 and 62.

Greene County tends to vote Republican. Since 1888, county voters have chosen the Republican Party nominee in 73% (24 of 34) of the elections through 2020.

Education
Greene County has five separate school districts.
Eastern Greene High School
Linton-Stockton High School
Shakamak Junior-Senior High School
White River Valley High School
Bloomfield High School

Geography

Adjacent counties

 Clay County – north
 Owen County – north
 Monroe County – east
 Lawrence County – southeast
 Martin County – south
 Daviess County – south
 Knox County – southwest
 Sullivan County – west

Cities
 Jasonville
 Linton

Towns

 Bloomfield
 Lyons
 Newberry
 Switz 
City
 Worthington

Census-designated places
 Owensburg
 Scotland

Other unincorporated places

 Antioch
 Beehunter
 Bushrod
 Calvertville
 Cincinnati
 Dixon
 Doans
 Dresden
 Elliston
 Furnace
 Gilmour (partial)
 Hashtown
 Hendricksville
 Hobbieville (called Jonesville 1837–1840)
 Hoosier
 Ilene
 Island City
 Johnstown
 Koleen
 Lone Tree
 Marco
 McVille
 Midland
 Midland Junction
 Mineral City (also called Mineral)
 Newark
 Park
 Plummer
 Point Commerce
 Redcuff Corner
 Ridgeport
 Rincon
 Solsberry
 Sponsler
 Stalcup Corner
 Summit
 Tanner
 Tulip
 Vicksburg
 Victoria
 White Rose

Townships

 Beech Creek
 Cass
 Center
 Fairplay
 Grant
 Highland
 Jackson
 Jefferson
 Richland
 Smith
 Stafford
 Stockton
 Taylor
 Washington
 Wright

Major highways

Economy
The Greene County Economic Development Corporation (GCEDC) currently serves to develop new businesses and support current businesses in Greene County, Indiana. This asset was established to assist in bringing projects to the county. Coupled with The Indiana Economic Development Corporation, Greene County has developed an incentive portfolio to assist potential new employers.

The county has been designated a Labor Surplus Area and an SBA HUB Zone (Historically Underused Business Zone), which provides advantages to county businesses in government contract bidding and eligibility for federal and state assistance. Employee location and screening services are offered by WorkOne Linton, the local branch of the Indiana State Workforce Development office. Worker training programs are available onsite and at the Greene County Community Learning Center, which serves as a local access site for area colleges and universities.

Demographics

As of the 2010 United States Census, there were 33,165 people, 13,487 households, and 9,276 families in the county. The racial makeup of the county was 98.1% white, 0.3% Asian, 0.3% American Indian, 0.1% black or African American, 0.3% from other races, and 0.9% from two or more races. Those of Hispanic or Latino origin made up 1.0% of the population. In terms of ancestry, 25.5% were German, 16.8% were Irish, 12.9% were American, and 11.2% were English.

Of the 13,487 households, 31.8% had children under the age of 18 living with them, 54.3% were married couples living together, 9.4% had a female householder with no husband present, 31.2% were non-families, and 27.0% of all households were made up of individuals. The average household size was 2.44 and the average family size was 2.92. The median age was 41.1 years.

The median income for a household in the county was $47,697 and the median income for a family was $50,740. Males had a median income of $41,524 versus $31,890 for females. The per capita income for the county was $20,676. About 10.0% of families and 14.4% of the population were below the poverty line, including 19.7% of those under age 18 and 8.9% of those age 65 or over.

2020 census

As of the 2020 United States Census the population was 30,803.

See also
 Maryland Ridge Community (Indiana)
 National Register of Historic Places listings in Greene County, Indiana
 Greene County Economic Development Corporation

References

 
Indiana counties
1821 establishments in Indiana
Populated places established in 1821